Vicente Ithier (born 22 April 1962) is a Puerto Rican basketball player. He competed in the men's tournament at the 1988 Summer Olympics.

References

1962 births
Living people
Puerto Rican men's basketball players
Olympic basketball players of Puerto Rico
Basketball players at the 1988 Summer Olympics
Place of birth missing (living people)